Oberea sanguinalis is a species of beetle in the family Cerambycidae. It was described by Hermann Julius Kolbe in 1893. It is known from Cameroon, Benin, and Togo.

References

Beetles described in 1893
sanguinalis
Taxa named by Hermann Julius Kolbe